Evdokia "Evina" Stamati (born 2 August 1984) is a Greek professional basketball player who plays for Olympiacos and Greece women's national basketball team. She was part of the Greek national team in Eurobasket 2017.

References

External links
Evina Stamati interview (in Greek)

Living people
Greek expatriate basketball people in Romania
Greek women's basketball players
Panathinaikos WBC players
Olympiacos Women's Basketball players
1984 births
Basketball players from Athens
Shooting guards